General elections were held in Saint Lucia on 23 September 1954. The result was a victory for the Saint Lucia Labour Party, which won five of the eight seats. Voter turnout was 49.4%.

Results

References

Saint Lucia
Elections in Saint Lucia
1954 in Saint Lucia
British Windward Islands
September 1954 events in North America